My X-Girlfriend's Wedding Reception is a 1999 comedy film directed by Martin Guigui.

Plot

The bride's ex-boyfriend is a member of the band, a collection of musical misfits, at an Italian-Jewish wedding.

Cast

Debbie Gibson
Dom DeLuise
Mo Gaffney
Kelly Bishop
Bernie Sanders as Rabbi Manny Schewitz

Production

It was filmed across various locations in Vermont, including Ascutney, Burlington, and Stowe.

The film had a budget of $500,000 and even if it did not achieve commercial success, it received lot of attention for the unique way it was directed, acted and filmed.

Release

It was released on DVD on December 5, 2006. A new Special Edition/ Director's Cut will be released in 2022 for the 25th anniversary i

Legacy

The film gained significant attention during the 2016 United States elections because of Democratic candidate Bernie Sanders' appearance, as a Rabbi.

References

External links 
 
 

1999 films
1999 comedy films
American comedy films
Films shot in Vermont
1990s English-language films
1990s American films